Tomislav Ružić (born July 2, 1979) is a Croatian professional basketball coach and former player.

Personal life
Ružić is married to the former Croatian international volleyball player, Barbara Jelić-Ružić. When Tomislav joined Beşiktaş in 2003, his wife Barbara had also joined a Turkish team, Eczacıbaşı.

Ružić has also acquired Turkish citizenship and played as a domestic player in Turkish League.

References

External links
TBLStat.net Profile

1979 births
Living people
ABA League players
ASVEL Basket players
Besançon BCD players
Croatian basketball coaches
Beşiktaş men's basketball players
Croatian men's basketball players
Gaziantep Basketbol players
Kepez Belediyesi S.K. players
KK Cibona players
KK Zadar players
Basketball players from Zadar
Tofaş S.K. players
Centers (basketball)